The 1933–34 season was Arsenal's 15th consecutive season in the top division of English football. The Gunners won the league again, for the third time in four years, again winning it at Chelsea, this time with a 2–2 draw. They finished three points clear of runners-up Huddersfield Town, but manager Herbert Chapman, who had invented the WM formation along with a host of other tactics, and had first suggested the use of floodlights and numbered shirts, as well as initiating with European competition, died of pneumonia on 6 January 1934. On the day of his death, the crowd at Highbury for that day's match stood to commemorate him.

Arsenal won the Charity Shield with a 3–0 triumph at Everton, but went out of the FA Cup against Aston Villa. Arsenal's biggest league win of the season was 6–0 against Middlesbrough; in all competitions it was 7–0 against Crystal Palace in the FA Cup fourth round. Their top scorer was once again Cliff Bastin, who scored 13 league goals and 15 in all competitions.

Results
Arsenal's score comes first

Legend

Football League First Division

Final League table

FA Cup

See also

 1933–34 in English football
 List of Arsenal F.C. seasons

References

English football clubs 1933–34 season
1933-34
1933-34